Karl Erik Jakob Samuelsson, better known as Jakob Samuel (born 19 February 1969) is a Swedish singer. He was the singer for the poprock-group The Poodles until they disbanded in 2018.  In 2011, he competed in Körslaget which was broadcast on TV4, placing third. 

His daughter Cornelia Jakobs is a singer and represented Sweden in the Eurovision Song Contest 2022.

References

External links

Swedish male singers
1969 births
Living people
Melodifestivalen contestants of 2008